The 2012 UCI BMX World Championships were the seventeenth edition of the UCI BMX World Championships and took place in Birmingham in the United Kingdom and crowned world champions in the cycling discipline of BMX.

Medal summary

Medal table

External links
Union Cycliste Internationale website

UCI BMX World Championships
UCI BMX World Championships
UCI BMX World Championships